Lake Anosy [anˈuːsi] is an artificial lake in the southern part of the capital city of Madagascar, Antananarivo, about two miles south of Haute-Ville. Ampefiloha is located to the west of the lake, Isoraka to the northwest and Mahamasina to the north.

A swamp was replaced with Lake Anosy during the era of the ruler Radama I. The lake was constructed by James Cameron who gave it a shape of a heart. In the middle of the lake, there is an island connected with the city by an isthmus. On the island there is a French-built memorial to those fallen in the first world war, the Monument aux Morts made by sculptor Barberis and architect Perrin in 1927. In the Radama I era there was a gunpowder factory on the island. Later there was built a summer residence for the Queen Ranavalona I.

By the lakeside there grow jacaranda trees that flower in October  and November. Great egrets used to take a rest by the lake. By the southern shore, there are barbers' kiosks. On the national independence day, June 26, an annual firework festival is arranged on the lake.

References

External links

Anosy
Antananarivo